The Man She Brought Back is a 1922 American silent Western film directed by Charles Miller and starring Earle Foxe, Frank Losee and Frederick Burton. It is a northern, portraying an officer of Canada's North-West Mounted Police.

Cast
 Earle Foxe as John Ramsey
 Doris Miller as Margo
 Frank Losee as Fenton
 Charles Mackay as Major Shanley
 Donald Russ as Songatawa
 Harry Lee as Sergeant Hawkins
 Frederick Burton as Bruce Webster

References

Bibliography
 Connelly, Robert B. The Silents: Silent Feature Films, 1910-36, Volume 40, Issue 2. December Press, 1998.
 Munden, Kenneth White. The American Film Institute Catalog of Motion Pictures Produced in the United States, Part 1. University of California Press, 1997.

External links
 

1922 films
1922 Western (genre) films
Silent American Western (genre) films
American silent feature films
American black-and-white films
Films directed by Charles Miller
Films set in Canada
1920s English-language films
1920s American films